Edwin Hyde (8 June 1828 – 1909) was a member of the Wisconsin State Assembly and the Wisconsin State Senate.

Biography
Hyde was born on June 8, 1828 in Keinton, England. In 1857, Hyde moved to Chicago, Illinois. He moved to Milwaukee, Wisconsin the following year.

Career
Hyde was a member of the Assembly twice. First, from 1867 to 1868 and second, from 1877 to 1878. He was a member of the Senate from 1879 to 1880. Additionally, Hyde was a member of the Milwaukee Common Council and the Milwaukee County, Wisconsin Board of Supervisors. He was a Republican.

References

External links

People from Somerset
English emigrants to the United States
Politicians from Chicago
Politicians from Milwaukee
Republican Party Wisconsin state senators
Republican Party members of the Wisconsin State Assembly
Wisconsin city council members
1828 births
1909 deaths
19th-century American politicians